Federico Consolo (April 4, 1841 – December 14, 1906) was an Italian violinist and composer.

Background and earlier life

Federico Consolo was born to Benjamin Consolo at Ancona in 1841. After studying the violin with Ferdinando Giorgetti in Florence and Vieuxtemps in Brussels, and composition with Fétis and Liszt, he played with great success at almost all the European courts and in the Orient. In 1884, however, he was compelled by a nervous affliction to discontinue violin-playing. He removed to Florence, and devoted himself to composition.

National anthem of San Marino

He composed the arrangement for the national anthem of San Marino, based on a 10th-century chorale, with lyrics by Giosué Carducci. It was adopted in 1894.

Other works

Other works include a number of Oriental cycles, concertos, and "Shire Yisrael" ("Libro dei Canti d'Israel," Florence, Bratti Edzioni, 1869), a collection of Sephardic synagogal melodies and original compositions. He subsequently undertook archeological studies, writing on musical notation, and especially on music in the Bible. He was a knight of several orders in different states.

See also

 Inno Nazionale della Repubblica (in English)

1841 births
1906 deaths
National anthem writers
Italian composers
Italian male composers
Italian violinists
Male violinists
People from Ancona
19th-century Italian musicians
19th-century Italian male musicians